Malcolm London is an American poet, educator, "artivist" and musician.

Early life 
London was born in 1993 and grew up in the west side of Chicago in Austin. He first started writing poems at age 12. He attended Lincoln Park High School. In his sophomore year, London won individual honors at the Louder Than A Bomb youth poetry competition. When he was 20, he gave a TED talk where he read a portion of his poem, "High School Training Grounds".

After graduating from high school in 2011, London began working for Kevin Coval, a fellow poet and educator who helped create the Louder Than A Bomb poetry festival. London was paid to help with the organization Young Chicago Authors, talking at local schools and running poetry workshops with students in the area.

Career 
In 2012, London worked with actor Matt Damon as part of an event called "The People Speak Live!". He appeared on a television series called "Verses & Flow". He read a poem entitled, "The First Time in a While" which was based on a peer of London's who had been killed in a fight. London was the youngest poet to appear in the first three seasons of the show.

London appeared in several TED Talks with John Legend and Bill Gates, and hosted events and performances with fellow YCA alum Chance the Rapper and rapper Lupe Fiasco. His performances of poetry have taken place at the Chicago Jazz Festival, the Du Sable Museum, the Vic Theater, The Metro, The Chicago Theater, Victory Gardens Theatre, and Steppenwolf Theater. London was the co-chair of the Chicago chapter of the Black Youth Project and has done service for Chicago Public Schools.  He was a member of UCAN's National Forum on Youth Violence Prevention.

Some of London's most famous poems are "High School Training Ground,” "Never Too Late,” “Rome Wasn’t Built In A Day (Love Sosa),” and “Why You Talk Like That.”

Police encounters 
In 2015, London was arrested at a protest against the murder of Laquan McDonald. London was a leader in the Black Youth Project 100, a group that helped organize the protests. London suffered a broken finger and filed a lawsuit with the Westside Justice Center.

References 

African-American poets
Year of birth missing (living people)
Living people
21st-century African-American people
21st-century American poets
Activists from Chicago
Violence against women in the United States
African-American male writers
Activists for African-American civil rights
African-American activists
American male poets
Date of birth missing (living people)
Poets from Illinois